Olga Potocka (1803 – 7 October 1861) was a Polish countess. She was the daughter of count Stanisław Szczęsny Potocki and Zofia Clavone.

On 4 April 1824 she married prince Lev Naryshkin. They had one daughter named Sofia (1829–1894), who later came to be the wife of Count Pyotr Pavlovich Shuvalov.

Olga
1803 births
1861 deaths